Rambeau may refer to:

People 
 Claire Rambeau (born 1951), American model
 Eddie Rambeau (born 1943), American singer 
 Marjorie Rambeau (1889–1970), American film and stage actress
 Pascal Rambeau (born 1972), French sailor

Fictional characters 
 Monica Rambeau, fictional character, a comic book superheroine in the Marvel Comics universe